Adnan Ibrahim Fallattah  [عدنان فلاته in Arabic] (born 20 October 1983) is a Saudi football player who currently plays as a left-back he last played for Abha.

Honours
Al-Ittihad
 Pro League: 2006–07, 2008–09
 King Cup: 2010, 2018
 Crown Prince Cup: 2004, 2016–17
 AFC Champions League: 2004, 2005
 Arab Champions League: 2004–05

Al-Fateh
 Pro League: 2012–13

References

 

1983 births
Living people
Saudi Arabian footballers
Ittihad FC players
Al Nassr FC players
Al-Wehda Club (Mecca) players
Al-Fateh SC players
Al-Taawoun FC players
Al-Qadsiah FC players
Abha Club players
Place of birth missing (living people)
Saudi Professional League players
Association football fullbacks